Paleoparadoxia ("ancient paradox") is a genus of large, herbivorous aquatic mammals that inhabited the northern Pacific coastal region during the Miocene epoch. It ranged from the waters of Japan (Tsuyama and Yanagawa), to Alaska in the north, and down to Baja California, Mexico.

Description
 
Paleoparadoxia is thought to have fed primarily on seaweeds and sea grasses. The jaws and the angle of the teeth resemble a backhoe bucket. Its bulky body was well adapted for swimming and underwater foraging. Originally interpreted as amphibious, Paleoparadoxia is now thought to have been a fully marine mammal like their living relatives, the sirenians, spending most of their lives walking across the sea bottom like marine hippos. Studies on its habitat preference show that it favoured deep, offshore waters.

 named the genus Cornwallius but  synonymized it as a species of Paleoparadoxia.

See also
Behemotops
Desmostylus
 Tethytheria

References

Bibliography

 
 
 
 
 
 
 

Desmostylians
Miocene mammals of North America
Miocene mammals of Asia
Miocene genus extinctions
Fossils of the United States
Fossil taxa described in 1959
Prehistoric placental genera
Fossils of Japan
Fossils of Mexico
Neogene Alaska